Hieracium horridum, known as the prickly hawkweed or shaggy hawkweed, is a species of plant in the family Asteraceae. It gets its name from the long, dense, shaggy white to brown hairs (trichomes) which cover all of the plant parts of this plant species. The species is native to Oregon, California, and Nevada in the western United States.

Name
The epithet horridum means 'bristly' in reference to its hairy leaves.

Description
It flowers between late June and August.

Like all members of the family Asteraceae, the flowers are actually florets made up of many ray corolla, each ray its own stamen. As with other plants of the tribe Cichorieae, the stems and leaves produce a milky substance when broken.

Distribution

References

External links

horrida
Flora of Oregon
Flora of California
Flora of Nevada
Plants described in 1862
Flora without expected TNC conservation status